The Lang ministry (1927) or Second Lang ministry or Lang Reconstruction ministry was the 43rd ministry of the New South Wales Government, and was led by the 23rd Premier, Jack Lang. This ministry was the second of three ministries where Lang was Premier.

Lang was first elected to the New South Wales Legislative Assembly in 1913 and served continuously until 1946. In 1923 Lang was elected NSW Parliamentary Leader of the Labor Party by Labor caucus, and became Opposition Leader. At the 1925 state election, Lang led Labor to victory, defeating the Nationalist Party led by Sir George Fuller.

Lang's initial ministry was confronted with extended cabinet strife, centred on Albert Willis. Lang resigned his commission on 26 May 1927. As there was no viable alternative government, Governor Sir Dudley de Chair recommissioned Lang to form a caretaker government on the condition that he would recommend a dissolution of the Legislative Assembly and call an early election, which was held in October 1927.

This reconstructed ministry covers the Lang Labor period from 27 May 1927 until 18 October 1927 when Lang was defeated by a Nationalist/Country coalition led by Thomas Bavin and Ernest Buttenshaw.

Composition of ministry
The composition of the ministry was announced by Premier Lang on 27 May 1927 and covers the period up to 18 October 1927.

 
Ministers are members of the Legislative Assembly unless otherwise noted.

See also

First Lang ministry
Third Lang ministry
Members of the New South Wales Legislative Assembly, 1925-1927

References

 

New South Wales ministries
1927 establishments in Australia
1927 disestablishments in Australia
Australian Labor Party ministries in New South Wales